This is a list of all songs sung by the American singer Suzi Quatro.

As Suzi Quatro 

Titles in bold mean released as a single.

Instrumental versions 
 Baby You're a Star (too)
 Kiss Me Goodbye (too)
 We Found Love (too)

Suzi Quatro songs covered by others 
 My Heart and Soul. (I need you home for Christmas) S Quatro R Tuckey Download 2020

As Quatro, Scott & Powell 
Members: Suzi Quatro, Andy Scott, Don Powell

Cover versions 
 My Heart and Soul. (I need you home for christmas) Suzi Quatro, Richard Tuckey

Quatro, Suzi